Bolyai Institute is the mathematics institute of the Faculty of Sciences of the University of Szeged, named after the Hungarian mathematicians, Farkas Bolyai, and his son János Bolyai, the co-discoverer of non-Euclidean geometry. Its director is László Zádori. Among the former members of the institute are Frigyes Riesz, Alfréd Haar, Rudolf Ortvay, Tibor Radó, Béla Szőkefalvi-Nagy, László Kalmár, Géza Fodor.

Departments
 Algebra and Number Theory (head: Mária Szendrei)
 Analysis (head: Lajos Molnár)
 Applied and Numerical Mathematics (head: Tibor Krisztin)
 Geometry (head: Árpád Kurusa)
 Set Theory and Mathematical Logic (head: Péter Hajnal)
 Stochastics (head: Gyula Pap)

External links
 Official website 
 A short history of the Bolyai Institute

Mathematical institutes
University of Szeged
Research institutes in Hungary